Abbot House may refer to:

In Scotland
Abbot House, Dunfermline, a heritage centre in Scotland
In the United States (by state)
Asa and Sylvester Abbot House, Andover, MA, listed on the NRHP in Massachusetts
Benjamin Abbot House, Andover, MA, listed on the NRHP in Massachusetts
Edwin Abbot House, Cambridge, MA, listed on the NRHP in Massachusetts
J. T. Abbot House, Andover, MA, listed on the NRHP in Massachusetts
Abbot-Stinson House, Andover, MA, listed on the NRHP in Massachusetts
Abbot-Baker House, Andover, MA, listed on the NRHP in Massachusetts
Abbot-Battles House, Andover, MA, listed on the NRHP in Massachusetts
Abbot House (Nashua, New Hampshire), listed on the NRHP in Hillsborough County, New Hampshire

See also
Abbott House (disambiguation)